Parodia concinna, the sun cup, is a species of cactus in the genus Parodia, native to southern Brazil and Uruguay. It has gained the Royal Horticultural Society's Award of Garden Merit.

References

concinna
Flora of South Brazil
Flora of Uruguay
Plants described in 1987